Rozstání is a municipality and village in Svitavy District in the Pardubice Region of the Czech Republic. It has about 700 inhabitants.

Notable people
Ewald Jarmer (born 1942), German boxer

References

Villages in Svitavy District